The Springville Historic District is a historic district in Springville, Utah, United States, that is listed on the National Register of Historic Places (NRHP).

Description

The  district includes Late 19th and Early 20th Century American Movements and other architecture among its 1,211 contributing resources. Within the boundaries of district are more than two dozen properties (mostly houses) that are individually listed on the National Register of Historic Places. Moreover, with a single exception, all the properties within Springville included on the register are located within the boundaries of the district.

According to its NRHP nomination it "is an upside-down-Utah-shaped district comprising the original Springville
town site and an extension of the city's historic neighborhoods to the southeast."  It includes 919 primary contributing buildings and 292 garages and other outbuildings that are contributing, out of 1,260 primary buildings and 707 outbuildings in the district area.

The district was listed on the NRHP January 21, 2004

See also

 National Register of Historic Places listings in Utah County, Utah

References

External links

Late 19th and Early 20th Century American Movements architecture
Historic districts in Utah County, Utah
Historic districts on the National Register of Historic Places in Utah
National Register of Historic Places in Utah County, Utah
Buildings and structures in Springville, Utah